"Nada De Ti" is a song recorded by Mexican singer Paulina Rubio, taken from her third studio album El Tiempo Es Oro (1995). It was released as the album's second single on March 12, 1995, and distributed by EMI Latin as a CD single. The track was written by Marco Flores and produced by Miguel Blasco, and was recorded in Madrid, Spain. Musically, it is a Latin pop song with elements of pop rock and tropical music that lyrically talk about overcome a bad relationship.

Rubio presented the song in numerous television shows throughout Latin America and during the promotion of El Tiempo Es Oro in Spain, where she performed in February 1996 during the Carnival of Santa Cruz de Tenerife. The song reached the top ten in the airplay charts in Mexico City and San Salvador.

Music video
The accompanying music video was filmed in Miami, Florida, when Rubio was finishing her photo shoot and directed by Raúl Estupiñan. In the video Rubio is a top model that conquers the cameraman with different costumes and poses. Parallel to that, she remembers her ex-boyfriend and the way he cheated on her with another woman. 

The video premiered on June 17, 1995, the 24th birthday on the En Vivo television show, hosted by Mexican journalist Ricardo Rocha.

Track listing and formats
 Mexico CD, Single, Promo

 "Nada De Ti" – 3:31

References

1995 singles
Paulina Rubio songs
Spanish-language songs
EMI Latin singles
Song recordings produced by Miguel Blasco
Songs written by Marco Flores (songwriter)